The Lines of Torres Vedras were lines of forts and other military defences built in secrecy to defend Lisbon, capital of Portugal, from the French during the Peninsular War. Named after the town of Torres Vedras, their construction was ordered by the commander of the British troops, Arthur Wellesley, 1st Duke of Wellington. The Lines were declared a National Heritage by the Portuguese Government in March 2019.

In total, 152 military works were carried out from October 1809 to 1812 by Portuguese workers supervised by British engineers. Most involved completely new constructions, although some existing structures, such as the castle at Torres Vedras, were adapted and it was also common to incorporate existing hilltop windmills in the designs. Some of the forts remain visible and 29 are maintained by the municipalities of Torres Vedras, Arruda dos Vinhos, Loures, Mafra, Sobral de Monte Agraço, and Vila Franca de Xira. Much restoration work has been carried out to celebrate the 200th anniversary of the Lines.

Forts

Citations

References

External links
 
 Friends of the Lines of Torres Vedras
 British Historical Society of Portugal, which organizes regular guided visits to the forts.
 Photographs and map of fort locations

Forts in Portugal
Lines of Torres Vedras